Nieuw Amsterdam is a 1974 object/sculpture by Salvador Dalí done after an 1899 bronze statue bust of Chief White Eagle by the  American sculptor and artist Charles Schreyvogel. In was then transformed by the Spanish-Catalan surrealist via his Paranoiac-critical method to include a painting executed upon the face of the bust of various doings in the Dutch West India Company colony of 
Nieuw Amsterdam.

References

1974 sculptures
Surrealist works
Works by Salvador Dalí